Mence is both a given name and surname. Notable people with the name include:

 Joe Mence (1921–2014), English cricket player
 Mence Dros-Canters (1900–1934), Dutch hockey, badminton, and tennis player
 Michael Mence (1944–2014), English cricket player

See also
 Bence